Kleinman is a surname.

Notable people with the surname include:
  (born 1981), Argentine businessman
 Arthur Kleinman (born 1941), American psychiatrist and medical anthropologist of China
 Daniel Kleinman (born 1955), British computer graphics artist
 David Kleinman (born 1977), American renowned healthcare technology executive and philanthropist
 Elly Kleinman (born 1952), American business executive and philanthropist
 Fay Kleinman (19122012), American painter
  (18971943, killed at the Janowska concentration camp), Polish painter
 Geoffrey Kleinman (born 1970), editor of DVDTalk
  (born 1970), Israeli swimmer
 Nathan "Nate" Kleinman, American farmer and activist
 Pablo Kleinman (born 1971), Argentine-American journalist
  (1929  1998), American mathematician
  (born 1965), Israeli law professor
 Steven Kleinman, officer in the United States Air Force Reserve

See also 
 
 Klineman

Yiddish-language surnames
Jewish surnames
German-language surnames